Zevgolateio is a village and a community in the municipal unit of Korythio, Arcadia, Greece.  In 2001, it had a population of 389 for the village, and 464 for the community, which includes the small village Parori. It is situated at the eastern edge of the plain of Tripoli, at about 650 m elevation. Zevgolateio is 2 km southeast of Pelagos, 3 km northwest of Steno and 6 km east of Tripoli.

Population

See also

List of settlements in Arcadia

References

External links
Zevgolateio at the GTP Travel Pages

Populated places in Arcadia, Peloponnese